The Tasman Highway (or A3) is a highway in Tasmania, Australia.  Like the Midland Highway, it connects the major cities of Hobart and Launceston – however it takes a different route, via the north-eastern and eastern coasts of the state. The Highway also acts as a major commuter road to Hobart residents living on the eastern side of the Derwent River. The designation "Tasman Highway" arises from its location facing the Tasman Sea – named, like the state itself, after Abel Tasman.  The highway is one of the longest in Tasmania - , with an average traveling time of 4 hours.

Eastern Outlet

The Eastern Outlet is a  section of the Tasman Highway between Hobart and Sorell. As one of the city's 3 major radial highways, the outlet connects traffic from the Hobart city centre with Hobart Airport and commuters on the eastern shore of the River Derwent as well as intrastate traffic on the east coast and Tasman Peninsula. With recorded Annual average daily traffic of 67,000, the Tasman Bridge is the busiest portion of the Eastern Outlet and the Tasman Highway as a whole.

History
In 1964, a comprehensive Transport Study of Hobart was undertaken calling for the construction of a Freeway to serve Hobart's growing eastern suburbs. Prior to opening of the Tasman Bridge in 1964 traffic travelling between Hobart and the airport had to make use of the Hobart Bridge as well as Rosny Hill Road and Cambridge Road. Passing through the Meehan Range, this route was windy and entirely two-lane featuring at-grade intersections. The first section of the new Highway between Rosny Hill Road and Mornington opened in 1974 as it exists today and continued to the airport as 3 lanes in its current alignment. During the 1990s, the section of highway between Mornington and the airport was fully duplicated with funds from the Federal Government. In 2002, the Pitt Water bridge was replaced with a new bridge built beside the existing structure with the causeway widened. In 2012, Department of Infrastructure, Energy and Resources progressively installed Variable speed limit signage between the airport and Hobart, citing the increased crashed rate on the road due to traffic and weather on the Meehan Range.

Future

The Department of Infrastructure, Energy and Resources has outlined several concepts for the upgrading of the Eastern Outlet portion of the Tasman Highway - Both short and long term. These include;
An upgrade of the highway at Montagu Bay, involving the addition of extra lanes and On/Off ramps between the East Derwent Highway and Rosny Hill Road, to provide safer passage of traffic travelling between these two Roads
The upgrading of the Holyman Avenue Roundabout into the airport at Cambridge.
The addition of On/Off Ramps at Gordons Hill Road at Rosny. 
The State government recently purchased land at Cambridge on the northern boundary of Hobart Airport to facilitate the future duplication of the Tasman Highway to Sorell.

Additionally, Independent bodies and proponents of the Highway have also made proposals of their own, including:
Building the Highway to limited access, dual carriageway standard between the Airport and Sorell.
Capacity upgrades between the Hobart city centre and the Mornington interchange.

Route
The southern section of the Highway commences on the fringe of the Hobart Central Business District at the intersection with the Brooker Highway and the Davey/Macquarie couplet. Featuring between four and five lanes of traffic and utilizing a lane management system for peak hour traffic, the highway travels north along the western shore of the Derwent River, intersecting with the Domain Highway before preceding over the Tasman Bridge. On the eastern side of the Bridge there are two interchanges in close proximity; the East Derwent Highway intersects the highway immediately after the bridge via the Lindisfarne Interchange and within 500 meters there is an interchange connecting Rosny Hill Road. From Rosny Hill Road the Tasman Highway continues east as a fully grade separated, Limited access highway intersecting with the South Arm Highway at Mornington and concluding at the airport roundabout. For the remaining  from the Airport the highway features 2 lanes of traffic, and travels over Mcgees Bridge and the Sorell Causeway to Sorell.

Sorell to St Helens
The road to Orford remains at the national standard as a two-lane highway, albeit with only a few overtaking lanes along its distance. The remainder of the road to St Helens is two lane, with even fewer overtaking opportunities.
In places, the eastern coastal portion of the highway runs just metres from the Tasman Sea, making it the easternmost A road in Tasmania.

The Tasman Highway is marketed as "East Coast Escape" between St Helens and Orford, to fit in with Tasmania's scheme of introducing tourist trails, a way of simplifying navigation of key tourist locations in Tasmania.

Prior to 1990, there was no coastal route between Falmouth and the Chain of Lagoons – one had to travel into and out of St Marys, both roads being steep grades.  The bypass was officially opened on 2 December 1991, though motorists had been using the partially constructed road before its opening.  Great care was taken during the construction to protect Aboriginal middens and the general environment.

St Helens to Launceston

At the Launceston end, the highway is a main road with traffic lights. Out of the city, it becomes an ordinary two-lane road through the mountains. It passes waterfalls and through timber and rainforest country.

The portion between Launceston and Scottsdale runs through the Sideling Range. There is a lookout which offers views of Scottsdale and its surrounds.

The highway also passes through several former mining towns.

Route
The highway passes through the following localities:

 Hobart
 Suburbs the Highway passes out of Hobart
 Rose Bay
 Rosny
 Warrane
 Mornington
 Cambridge
 Midway Point
 Sorell
 Orielton''
 Runnymede
 Buckland
 Orford
 Swansea
 (Freycinet National Park)
 Bicheno
 (St Marys)
 Scamander
 St Helens
 Scottsdale
 St Leonards and other Launceston suburbs
 Launceston

Major intersections

See also

 Hobart Area Transportation Study
 Highways in Australia
 List of highways in Tasmania

References

External links

Highways in Hobart